Chachakumani (Quechua chachakuma a medical plant, -ni an Aymara suffix, "the one with the chachakuma plant, also spelled Chachacomani) is a  mountain in the Bolivian Andes. It is located in the Cochabamba Department, Tapacari Province. Chachakumani lies northwest of Janq'u Pukara and Ñuñu Qullu.

References 

Mountains of Cochabamba Department